Christian Gabriel Oliva Giménez (born 1 June 1996) is a Uruguayan professional footballer who plays as a defensive midfielder for Argentinian club Talleres.

Club career

Nacional
Oliva was born in Delta El Tigre, Ciudad del Plata, San José Department. After starting it out at hometown side Club de Bochas de Delta El Tigre, he joined Nacional's youth setup. Subsequently released, he joined Bella Vista before returning to Nacional in 2016.

In January 2018, after scoring 17 goals for the reserve side, Oliva was promoted to Nacional's first team by manager Alexander Medina, who also worked with him in the B-team. He made his professional debut late in the month, coming on as a second-half substitute for Luis Aguiar in a 3–1 loss against Peñarol, for the year's Supercopa Uruguaya.

Oliva made his Primera División debut on 10 February 2018, playing 14 minutes in a 3–0 away win against Rampla Juniors. His first goal in the category came on 15 April, as he scored the game's only in a home defeat of Boston River. A regular starter, he extended his contract until 2020 on 25 April.

Cagliari
On 25 January 2019, Oliva signed to Italian Serie A club Cagliari; the deal was a loan with an obligation to sign permanently until 2023 and an option for a further year. Unused in his first season on Sardinia, he made his debut as a 55th-minute substitute for the injured Luca Cigarini in a 3–1 home win over Genoa, and scored his first goal on 3 November to secure a 2–0 victory at Atalanta. On 28 January 2022, his contract with Cagliari was terminated by mutual consent.

Loan to Valencia
On 1 February, Oliva joined Spanish side Valencia CF on loan for the remainder of the 2020–21 season.

Talleres
On 12 February 2022, Oliva signed a contract with Talleres in Argentina until 2024.

Career statistics

References

External links
 
 

1996 births
Living people
People from San José Department
Uruguayan footballers
Association football midfielders
Club Nacional de Football players
Cagliari Calcio players
Valencia CF players
Talleres de Córdoba footballers
Uruguayan Primera División players
Argentine Primera División players
Serie A players
La Liga players
Uruguayan expatriate footballers
Expatriate footballers in Italy
Uruguayan expatriate sportspeople in Italy
Expatriate footballers in Spain
Uruguayan expatriate sportspeople in Spain
Expatriate footballers in Argentina
Uruguayan expatriate sportspeople in Argentina